Elena Borisovna Frolova (born 1 October 1969, in Riga) is a Russian singer-songwriter, composer, and poet. She is author and performer of songs based on poems by many Russian poets of twentieth century, including Marina Tsvetaeva, Sophia Parnok, Joseph Brodsky, Anna Barkova, Andrei Belyi, Varlam Shalamov, Maria Petrovykh, Veniamin Blazhenny, Bulat Okudzhava, and many others, as well as her own poetry. Frolova is one of few performers who uses Russian folk instrument gusli and ancient harp, along with classical six-string guitar for the accompaniment. During 25 years of work she created more than 630 songs and published more than 40 music albums.

Biography
Born in Riga, Frolova composed her first song at age of 15. That was song on poem "I wrote on the slate" by Marina Tsvetaeva. She was a winner of many song and music festivals, including the Second All-Union Festival in Tallinn in 1988. Since 1988 Elena performed together with Vera Evushkina, in the author's duet "VerLen". She is a co-founder and active member of creative group "ASiA", together with Tatiana Aleshina, Alexander Derevyagin and Nicholai Yakimov. She is a member of juries in Russian art song festivals, including Grushinsky festival. During last few years, Elena made a number of tours in trio "Trilogy" with performer of Russian romance Julia Ziganshina and singer-songwriter Elmira Galeeva,

Since 1989, Elena Frolova worked in Moscow Theatre of Music and Poetry directed by Elena Kamburova. She is a member of Union of Russian Writers. Since 1991, she made many tours with her solo concerts in Russia, Germany, Italy, France, and Israel. Her songs on poems by Russian poets of the Silver Age and her own poetry brought her wide recognition. According to Marina Gershenovich : "The cycle of songs based on poems by Marina Tsvetaeva makes you to believe in the idea of reincarnation. The image of Marina is just as real as your own perception of reality. Coming through the music and voice of Elena, Tsvetaeva rebels, loves, tell prophecies, makes fun, and creates... One can bring back from the death someone he truly loves. Elena Frolova does it with her songs." A documentary about work by Frolova on poetry by Tsvetaeva was created by Irina Roerig

In 1996, Elena has mastered a new instrument, gusli, to perform Russian folk and other songs.

Since 2002, she participates in World Music festivals and concerts in Russia, many countries around the Europe, Israel, Argentina, and Mexico. She performed in Théâtre de la Ville, Bienvenue à la Maison des Cultures du Monde and Théâtre des Abbesses in Paris, Teatro de la República in Mexico, as well as in Barcelona, Madrid, Brussels and Antwerp. Since 2008 she has been a regular guest at the Festival of Arts in Naxos.

Frolova took part in the congress "The historical experience of the Soviet Communist totalitarianism: the opposition to Gulag" in Milan in 2003 with the program on poems by Varlam Shalamov. In March 2004, she represented Russia at the First International Festival "Eurasia Diva" in Moscow.

In 2007 she published a book of her poetry, "Song for Eurydice". Frolova also participates in creation of animated movies. She performed romance Don't wake her up at dawn... on words by Afanasy Fet in My Love by Aleksandr Petrov and composed music for animated version of The Legend of Lady Godiva

Poetry
Elena composed many songs on her own poetry, one of the most popular being A Straw. Many of her poems and songs have strong spiritual and Christian components, such as her Journey into Eden, a song dedicated to Francis of Assisi, and Disciple Day.

Concerts published on YouTube
Blessed are the humble in spirit (Introduction, Part 1, Part 2a, Part 2b, Part 3), 2010–2011, link to DVD, 2013
Russian Romance, Selected songs, Moscow, 2011
Film-concert "Dorozhenka (That path).", Minsk, 2006
Road to Heaven, concert in Kazan, 2003
Concert in Yekaterinburg, 2009, where she presented songs on poetry by Marina Tsvetaeva, Sophia Parnok and Gubanov (Part 1) and her own poetry (Part 2)
Elena Frolova and Dmitry Strotsev, part 1 and part 2, 2006
Ten years to duet VerLen, Part 1 and Part 2, 1998
Concerts and interviews on TV: Music of meetings and One who came to us, Above the roof, 2010

Selected discography
Songs on her own poetry
Wanderer 1995
My white sparrow, 1995
Heaven loves you, 1997
Dear road, Russian folk songs; poetry by Sergey Yesenin and Frolova, 2002
 Travel to Paradise, 2005
Solar thread, 2006  
 Songs of heart, 2009
Lada, Russian folk songs, Esenin and Frolova, 2009, records at thankyou.ru
Songs on poetry by Tsvetaeva
Angel and lion, Tsvetaeva, Blok and Mandelshtam, 1992
Annunciation Day, 1995 records
My Tsvetaeva part 1 and part 2, 2002
El sol de la tarde, 2008 
Khvanyn'-Kolyvan, 2007
Discs with Vera Evushkina
Verlen, 1992
Listen by heart, 2008 (1996–1998, 2006 records)
Oh, listen!, 2003
My love, color the green, Tsvetaeva, Esenin and others, 1995
Dove flied, 1999 
Poetry by Joseph Brodsky: Romance of a happy man, 2010
Clouds are passing by, 2005, poetry by Parnok, Shalamov, Blazhenny, Tsvetaeva, Gershenovich and others
A little theater on the small planet of Earth, 2009, poetry by Andrei Belyi
Letter, 2003, poetry by Varlam Shalamov
Wind from Viagolosa, poetry by Sophia Parnok, 2002
A concert, 2003, songs on poems by Anna Barkova, Osip Mandelshtam, Veniamin Blazhenny, Varlam Shalamov, Anna Akhmatova and others
Willow bird, songs on poems by Marina Gershenovich, Irina Ratushinskaya, Veniamin Blazhenny and others, 1999
Bright holiday of homelessness, 1995, Brodsky, Tsvetaeva, Yuri Levitansky, Mikhail Kuzmin
Poetry by Dmitry Strotsev: part 1, part 2, link, 2002
Seconda Parte, disk in collaboration with creative group AZIA, 2002
A concert, part 1, part 2, 2003
Mandelshtam Street, 2005, songs on poetry by Osip Mandelshtam
Stairs of love, poetry by Leonid Gubanov, 2008
Discs with Elmira Galeeva and Yulia Ziganshina
Trilogia, 2006
Rosemary, sage..., 2008
Dear Enemy, 2007, poetry by Anna Barkova
Russian Asian, 2007, Barkova, Frolova, Parnok 
Running girl – Russian Psyche, a concert, 2009
IZ NEDR И НА ВЕТВЬ, 2009
Bird Tango, Brodsky, Tsvetaeva, Blazhenny, Petrova, Frolova, 2010
A concert, 2010
Amor mio. Αγάπη μου. My love, Folk songs, poetic translations/texts to Russian by Frolova, 2011
A concert, 2011
Ves, Soundtrack to the poetry collection, poetry by Strotsev, Gershenovich, Vertinsky, Gumilev, Zabolotsky, Levitansky, 2013

References

External links
 Older official website
 Unofficial (fan) website
 Facebook page
 Page on VK
  YouTube channel
 Her site on Kroogi
 Page in project «АЗиЯ»
 Discography and publications (Russian)
 Her presentations (Russian) on September 2012 and December 2014 at Echo of Moscow, hosted by Natella Boltyanskaya
 Texts of songs by Frolova (Russian) on her site and Anthroposophy website

Russian women singer-songwriters
Russian folk singers
Russian actresses
Russian musicians
Russian women poets
Russian women musicians
Russian bards
Christian poets
Living people
1969 births
Russian singer-songwriters
Soviet women singer-songwriters
Soviet singer-songwriters
20th-century Russian women singers
20th-century Russian singers